Monica Friday (born April 19, 1988)  is a Nigerian film actress, influencer, realtor, model and producer.

Early life and education
Monica was born at Badagry and grew up at Ajegunle, a neighbourhood located in Lagos into a Christian home. She started her Education at  Mistermis Kiddies Academy. She completed her secondary school education at Newland Senior Secondary School, Lagos before she proceeded to Olabisi Onabanjo University, Ogun State where she studied Mass Communication.

Career
She made her first television appearance playing a role as an extra in a Wale Adenuga project titled a New Song, Her first major film role was in 2015 when she appeared in Remi Vaughan-Richards's film Unspoken.

Monica has starred in long-running 2015 M-Net series, "Do Good" and African Tale Film "Dérè" released in 2016.
In 2019, She starred in the movie " Zena" as Rexiha.

Television series
Do Good 
The Village Headmaster 
Dérè
Flat Mates
So Wrong, So Good

Filmography

Bad Generation (2008)
Being Mrs Elliot (2014)
The King's Cross (2019)
October 1 (2014)
Murder at Prime Suites (2013)
The First Lady (2015)
Wives on Strike (2014)
Abducted (2015)
Zena (2019) 
Mothers & Daughters In-Law (2019) 
Timeless Passion (2020)
Unspoken (2015)
Labour Room (2017) 
Iquo's Journal (2015)
Cliché (2016) 
Hoodrush (2012)
Two Brides And A Baby (2011) 
Bonny & Clara (2019) 
Savior(2015) 
My Body My Proud (2020) 
Silent Murder (2021)

Production
Sealed Lips (2018)
Yoruba Demons (2018) 
Best Mistake (2019)
Mr Romanus (2020) 
Chronicles of Ejiro (2020)

References

External links
 
Monica Friday on Instagram

1988 births
Living people
Nigerian film actresses
21st-century Nigerian actresses
Residents of Lagos
Yoruba actresses
Nigerian television actresses
Olabisi Onabanjo University alumni
20th-century births
Nigerian Internet celebrities
Nigerian film producers
Nigerian women film producers
Nigerian businesspeople
Nigerian women in business